, also known as 
, is a convention center in the city of Osaka, Japan.

Located adjacent to the convention center is underground Nakanoshima Station served by Keihan Electric Railway Nakanoshima Line as the terminus.

Past events 
2001 World Tourism Organization Congress
2004 Rotary International World Convention
34th G8 summit Finance minister convention
Japanese High School Baseball Championship Draw (2009)
26th International Conference on Computational Linguistics (2016)
 Fanmeeting 2019: SONE Japan presents - Taeyeon's Atelier-

References

External links 

Buildings and structures in Osaka
Tourist attractions in Osaka
Music venues in Japan
Nakanoshima
Convention centers in Japan
Event venues established in 2000
2000 establishments in Japan